The 2015 Sacramento Republic FC season is the club's second season of existence. The club is playing in the newly rebranded United Soccer League (USL), formerly known as USL Pro, the third tier of the American soccer pyramid. After offseason expansion of the USL from 14 to 24 teams and division into an Eastern and Western Conference, Sacramento Republic FC is competing in the new Western Conference of the USL. The Republic will be playing as defending champions, having defeated the Harrisburg City Islanders 2–0 on September 27, 2014. The season began on March 21 and concluded on September 20.

Background 

Winter 2014–15, USL Pro's off season, saw numerous headlines for Sacramento Republic FC. Owner Warren Smith, Technical Director Graham Smith, Sacramento Mayor Kevin Johnson and other delegates met with MLS officials, including Commissioner Don Garber, several times to continue their push for a MLS franchise. MLS announced February 2015 that Las Vegas was no longer in contention for an MLS franchise, narrowing the list of potentials to Sacramento and Minneapolis.

Republic's efforts with MLS as well as their successes on and off the pitch rallied many to help invest in the club to push further Republic FC's efforts for an MLS franchise. These investors include co-founder and ex-CEO of Envision Pharmaceutical Kevin Negal, UFC fighter Urijah Faber, Sacramento Kings owner Vivek Ranadivé, San Francisco 49ers owners the York Family.

As success and popularity grew, demand for more seating at Bonny Field grew. The Board of Directors of Cal Expo approved expanded seating at Bonney Field and the endline stands were removed and replaced with 30-row bleachers, increasing the capacity to around 11,000.

For the 2015 season, USL Pro expanded to 24 teams, including Portland Timbers 2, concluding Portland's USL affiliation with the Republic.

Club
As of June 19, 2015.

Technical Staff 
As of June 25, 2015.

Competitions

Preseason

USL

Results summary

Standings

USL Pro Playoffs

Playoff Results

U.S. Open Cup

Friendlies

Transfers

In

Out

Loan in

References

American soccer clubs 2015 season
2015 in sports in California
2015 USL season
2015